Gesneria cuneifolia (yerba parrera) is a plant species in the family Gesneriaceae.

References

 Nat. Pflanzenfam. 4(3b): 184 1894.

cuneifolia